Hillingdon tube station is a London Underground station in North Hillingdon in the London Borough of Hillingdon, West London. Located between Uxbridge and Ickenham, it is in Travelcard Zone 6. It is the penultimate station on the Uxbridge branch of both the Metropolitan line and the Piccadilly line. Resited in 1992, it is also the most recently constructed station on the Metropolitan line.

History
The Metropolitan Railway (Harrow & Uxbridge Railway) constructed the line between Harrow on the Hill and Uxbridge; this was opened on 4 July 1904, with an intermediate station at Ruislip. At first services were operated by steam trains, before electrification was completed on 1 January 1905.

Development in north Middlesex over the next two decades led to the opening of additional stations to encourage the growth of new residential areas. Hillingdon was the last of these to open, on 10 December 1923, with Metropolitan and District line services.

On 23 October 1933, the District line service was replaced by the Piccadilly line. Between the mid-1930s and the mid-1950s the station was named Hillingdon (Swakeleys), a name which is still displayed on the platform roundels. The goods yard closed in August 1964.

New station in 1990s
To enable the widening of the A40 (Western Avenue) at Hillingdon Circus, the old station was demolished and a new station built to the south. Designed by architects Cassidy Taggart Partnership in a deconstructivism design, the new station opened to the south of the original on 6 December 1992. Widely acclaimed, the station received a 1996 Civic Trust Award for its design and the 1994 Underground Station of the Year award. The station was identified in July 2011 as one of the London Borough of Hillingdon's locally listed buildings.

The station has a car park and is accessible for those with disabilities without using stairs or escalators. It is staffed, but the ticket office was closed in July 2015. Next-train indicators were installed in the ticket hall and on both platforms during May 2016; this coincided with works aimed at improving the station, including cleaning the glass station canopy and sealing off areas of the roof to deter nesting birds.

In September 2019, a fight on the platform led to the murder of 20 year old Tashan Daniel. His two assailants were convicted of murder and manslaughter.

Services

Metropolitan line
The Metropolitan line is the only line to operate an express service, though currently for Metropolitan Line trains on the Uxbridge branch this is eastbound only in the morning peaks (06:30 to 09:30) Monday to Friday.

The off-peak service in trains per hour (tph) is:
 8tph Eastbound to Aldgate via Baker Street (all stations)
 8tph Westbound to Uxbridge

The morning peak service in trains per hour (tph) is:
 2tph Eastbound to Aldgate via Baker Street (semi-fast)
 4tph Eastbound to Aldgate via Baker Street (all stations)
 4tph Eastbound to Baker Street (all stations)
 10tph Westbound to Uxbridge

The evening peak service in trains per hour (tph) is:
 7tph Eastbound to Aldgate via Baker Street (all stations)
 3tph Eastbound to Baker Street (all stations)
 10tph Westbound to Uxbridge

Piccadilly line
Between Rayners Lane and Uxbridge there is no Piccadilly Line service before approximately 06:30 (Monday - Friday) and 08:45 (Saturday - Sunday), except for one early morning departure from Uxbridge at 05:18 (Monday - Saturday) and 06:46 (Sunday).

The off-peak service in trains per hour (tph) is:
 3tph Eastbound to Cockfosters
 3tph Westbound to Uxbridge

The peak time service in trains per hour (tph) is:
 6tph Eastbound to Cockfosters
 6tph Westbound to Uxbridge

Connections
London Buses routes 278 and U2
Oxford Tube

References

External links

 
 
 
 
 
 
 

Former Metropolitan Railway stations
Metropolitan line stations
Piccadilly line stations
Railway stations in Great Britain opened in 1923
Tube stations in the London Borough of Hillingdon
1923 establishments in England